The Java campaign of 1806–1807 was a minor campaign during the Napoleonic Wars by British Royal Navy forces against a naval squadron of the Kingdom of Holland, a client state of the French Empire, based on the island of Java in the Dutch East Indies. Seeking to eliminate any threat to valuable British merchant convoys passing through the Malacca Straits, Rear-Admiral Sir Edward Pellew determined in early 1806 that the Dutch naval forces based at Java, which included several ships of the line and three frigates, had to be defeated to ensure British dominance in the region. Lacking the forces to effect an invasion of the Dutch colony, Pellew instead sought to isolate and blockade the Dutch squadron based at Batavia in preparation for raids specifically targeting the Dutch ships with his main force.

Although his plans were delayed by inadequate resources and the Vellore Mutiny in India, Pellew sent the frigate HMS Greyhound to the Java Sea in July 1806. Greyhound intercepted and defeated a Dutch convoy off the coast of Sulawesi on 25 July and three months later the frigate HMS Caroline managed to capture the Dutch frigate Maria Riggersbergen at the entrance to Batavia harbour. Following these successes, Pellew was able to bring his main force to bear on the island and in November 1806 launched a major raid on Batavia, destroying the remaining frigate and a number of minor warships from the Dutch squadron. The Dutch ships of the line had escaped prior to Pellew's attack to the harbour of Griessie near Surabaya, and although they were old and in a poor state of repair Pellew was forced to lead a second operation to Java in October 1807, capturing the port and eliminating the last Dutch naval forces in the east.

The victory gave Britain dominance over its European rivals in the western Pacific and eastern Indian Ocean, allowing free passage of British trade through the region and allowing British forces to focus on the one remaining threat to their merchant convoys in the Indian Ocean: the French islands of Île Bonaparte and Isle de France (now Mauritius).

Background
At the start of 1806, control of the Indian Ocean in the Napoleonic Wars was disputed. The French Empire and its client state the Kingdom of Holland held significant naval bases in the region, from which their warships could operate against British interests. The French islands of Île Bonaparte and Isle de France dominated the central Indian Ocean, their position allowing raiders to cruise British trade routes and attack isolated convoys, while the Dutch colonies at the Cape of Good Hope and the Dutch East Indies controlled the points of entry to the ocean from east and west with their own naval squadrons. The British, whose bases in India gave them control of the Northern Indian Ocean, were able to obtain supplies and reinforcements from Europe more easily than their enemies, as the Royal Navy was already dominant in European waters, but British forces in the region were still insufficient to make a significant impact on the French and Dutch territories. Control of the Indian Ocean was essential for the British war effort, because the British economy relied heavily on trade with the holdings of the Honourable East India Company in India and with other ports in the east, particularly in China.

In 1803 at the outbreak of the Napoleonic Wars, a French squadron under Rear-Admiral Charles Linois was already operating in the Indian Ocean against British commerce, initially based at Isle de France. Linois's principal target was the China Fleet, a large annual convoy of valuable East Indiamen merchant ships and smaller "country ships" that sailed from Canton early in the year and crossed the Indian Ocean to the Cape of Good Hope, then passing northwards to Europe. In 1804, this convoy was worth over £8 million and included 29 ships which—due to the sudden news of the outbreak of war—were entirely unprotected by the Royal Navy during the first leg of its journey across the South China Sea. Although Linois was not aware of the weakness of the convoy's defences, he knew of its importance and value and determined to intercept it, using Batavia on the island of Java as his main base. Ultimately Linois failed to defeat the convoy, withdrawing after some initial skirmishing at the Battle of Pulo Aura, but the importance of Batavia as a base against British shipping was confirmed.

The British commander in the Indian Ocean, Rear-Admiral Peter Rainier, was preoccupied with protecting merchant shipping off India during 1804 and 1805 to be able to risk an expedition to the Java Sea. His successor, Rear-Admiral Sir Edward Pellew was distracted by the continued operations of Linois's squadron and attacks from frigates based at Isle de France to take any action against the Dutch before the beginning of the monsoon season at the end of 1805, at which point the threat posed by hurricanes prevented any major seabourne operations. However, by early 1806, the departure of Linois into the Atlantic Ocean allowed Pellew and his squadron in Madras to consider offensive operations against enemy harbours. In addition to the threat from cruising French squadrons, the Dutch maintained their own force on Java, under Rear-Admiral Hartsinck at Batavia. This squadron—which consisted of four ships of the line, three frigates and a number of smaller warships—was principally tasked with anti-piracy operations, but their presence so close to the Malacca Straits was a source of concern to the British command in India.
Control of the Indian Ocean was essential for the British war effort, because the British economy relied heavily on trade with the holdings of the Honourable East India Company in India and with other ports in the east, particularly in China.[4]

Campaign

Frigate reconnaissance

Pellew's efforts to launch a major deployment in 1806—initially planned to be against Isle de France in conjunction with Rear-Admiral Sir Thomas Troubridge before the target was changed to Java—were delayed by the diversion of his Royal Marines to put down the Vellore Mutiny. Nevertheless, Pellew despatched several frigates to the Java Sea to reconnoitre the region, attack Dutch shipping and report on the state of the Dutch squadron maintained at Batavia. The first ships despatched were the 32-gun frigate HMS Greyhound under Captain Edward Elphinstone and the 18-gun brig-sloop HMS Harrier under Commander Edward Troubridge, son of Admiral Troubridge. Elphinstone initially cruised through the Molucca Islands in June and July with some success, and on 25 July he discovered four Dutch ships passing through the Selayar Strait. Cautious of the larger force, Elphinstone observed the Dutch ships during the night and on the morning of 26 July identified the ships as a frigate, a corvette and two merchant ships, including a large East Indiaman. In response to the British ships, the Dutch commander N. L. Aalbers formed his convoy into a line of battle, hoping to dissuade Elphinstone from pressing home his attack. The British were not deterred and Greyhound engaged the Dutch frigate Pallas directly while Harrier passed between the frigate and the merchant ship next in line, raking them both. Within 40 minutes, Pallas had surrendered and Harrier then successfully chased down and captured the two merchant ships while the corvette fled to the Sulawesi coast, evading pursuit.

In the wake of Elphinstone's success, a second frigate entered Dutch waters, HMS Caroline under Captain Peter Rainier (nephew of Admiral Rainier) cruising the Java Sea during October. There Rainer discovered that the Dutch ships of the line had sailed eastward from Batavia, except Schrikverwekker, which had been wrecked in the Thousand Islands on 18 May with the loss of two men. He also learned that the Dutch frigate  was undergoing repairs at an exposed anchorage on Onrust Island close to Batavia harbour. Sailing to investigate, Caroline arrived off the port on 18 October, but encountered two Dutch brigs that raised the alarm, allowing Phoenix to escape into the main harbour. Undeterred, Rainier sailed into Batavia roadstead and there discovered a number of small warships and the frigate Maria Riggersbergen. The smaller ships drove themselves on shore rather than fight the larger British vessel, but Captain Claas Jager on Maria Riggersbergen engaged Caroline. In a battle lasting 30 minutes, the Dutch ship was defeated and captured, Rainier sending the prisoners on shore and removing the frigate, which was later renamed HMS Java.

Attack on Batavia

Encouraged by the success of his frigates in the Java Sea, Pellew mustered a significant force in the early autumn of 1806, including four ships of the line, two frigates and a brig with which to eliminate the remaining Dutch squadron. Reaching the Sunda Strait on 23 November, Pellew passed by the port of Bantam and on 27 November reached Batavia, splitting his forces so that the lighter vessels sailed close to shore and the ships of the line remained in deeper water outside the channel entering the harbour. A corvette was captured, and the rest of the Dutch squadron was taken by surprise, mistaking Pellew's force for a French squadron. By the time their mistake was revealed, the harbour was already blocked and so Captain Vander Sande drove Phoenix ashore, followed by six other warships and 22 merchant ships.

Determined to eliminate the Dutch ships, Admiral Pellew gave orders that the squadron's boats gather next to the frigate  commanded by his son Captain Fleetwood Pellew. Boarding parties of sailors and Royal Marines were then despatched to the stranded Dutch vessels, under the distant cover of the frigates and coming under attack by Dutch batteries from the shoreline. Boarding Phoenix, it was discovered that Vander Sande had scuttled his ship, rendering Phoenix useless. Taking over the wrecked ship's guns, Captain Pellew opened fire on the other grounded ships, as his boats approached and boarded them in turn, the entire operation conducted with the loss of just one man killed and four wounded. Once taken, the ships that could not be refloated were burnt, Captain Pellew waiting until the rest of the Dutch ships were destroyed before setting fire to the wreck of Phoenix and returning to his ship. In total, one frigate, seven smaller warships and 20 merchant ships were destroyed, while one small warship and two merchant craft were captured. With his objective complete, Admiral Pellew ordered his ships to disperse and return to friendly ports for the winter.

Griessie

When the winter hurricane season ended in the spring of 1807, Admiral Pellew found his squadron dispersed on a variety of operations from the Red Sea to the South China Sea. Without the forces required for an extended operation against the remainder of the Dutch squadron, Pellew was forced to limit his operations in the Java Sea to frigate reconnaissance, sending HMS Caroline and Psyche (under Fleetwood Pellew) to ascertain the exact location of the Dutch ships of the line. On 29 August, the frigates reached Panka at the easternmost point of Java and the following day captured a merchant ship from Batavia which revealed that the Dutch ships of the line were anchored at Griessie near Surabaya and had deteriorated beyond repair. With their mission complete, the frigates separated to raid Dutch shipping, Psyche sailing west along the coast until Pellew reached the port of Semarang.

Observing two ships at anchor in Semarang roads, Pellew sent in his ship's boats on the morning of 31 August under the command of Lieutenant Kersteman. Despite heavy fire from batteries on shore, Kersteman successfully towed the vessels out without suffering any casualties, capturing an 8-gun schooner and a merchant brig. While the boats were engaged at Semarang, Pellew sighted three vessels cruising off the mouth of the harbour and hastily set fire to the prizes and reclaimed his boats, setting off in pursuit. Psyche closed with the grounded ships and exchanged fire with them at long range, the shallow coastal water preventing a close range engagement. At 16:30, just as Pellew was hoisting out his boats in preparation for a boarding action, one of the ships surrendered. Within minutes, the others followed, firing final broadsides and hauling down their colours. The surrendered ships were boarded and refloated, their identities established as the 24-gun corvette Scipio, the armed merchant ship Resolutie and the 12-gun Dutch East India Company ship Ceres. Dutch casualties are unknown but the commander of the convoy—Captain Carriage—was killed in the brief engagement, while Psyche survived the action without a man killed or wounded. All of the prisoners were landed at Semarang under terms of parole, as many of Pellew's men were away from the ship in prizes and men could not be spared to watch the Dutch prisoners.

In the summer of 1807, responsibility for the blockade of the French Indian Ocean bases passed from Pellew at Madras to Rear-Admiral Albemarle Bertie at the Cape of Good Hope. This enabled Pellew to concentrate on the Dutch East Indies and temporarily relocate his base to Malacca on the Malay Peninsula. Following the reports of his scouting frigates, Pellew sailed from Malacca with a squadron of ships on 20 November, intending to destroy the remaining Dutch vessels on Java. Arriving at the Madura Strait on 5 December, Pellew sent a small boat party to Griessie with a demand that the Dutch authorities surrender the ships. However, Captain Cowell—the American-born Dutch naval commander—refused the demand and arrested the boat party, notifying Pellew of his actions and preparing his defences. The following day, Pellew sailed his squadron into the Straits, exchanging fire with a gun battery at Sambelangan on Madura Island.

As Pellew's squadron neared Griessie, a message arrived from the Dutch civilian governor at Sourabaya, reversing Cowell's orders and offering a full surrender. Pellew accepted the message and on 7 December his ships entered Griessie. However, during the time it had taken to exchange messages, Cowell had ordered that all shipping in Griessie harbour be destroyed to prevent the British gaining control of it. The ships were scuttled in shallow water, leaving only wrecked hulls for the British to claim. Pellew ordered the hulls burned, and British landing parties investigated the town, burning and destroying all military supplies and cannon they found. Another party landed at Sambelangan and demolished the battery there. Pellew withdrew on 11 December, his ambition of destroying the Dutch naval presence in the East Indies complete.

Aftermath
The success of the campaign against the Dutch squadron in the East Indies allowed British forces in the Indian Ocean to focus exclusively on the French islands of Île Bonaparte and Isle de France, which proved very difficult to subdue during the ensuing Mauritius campaign of 1809–1811. Freedom of movement for British forces in the East Indies proved invaluable however: on 27 January 1807, Peter Rainier in Caroline had seized a Spanish ship San Raphael carrying over half a million Spanish dollars and an exceptionally valuable cargo, and the ability of British commerce raiders to act against French, Spanish and Dutch merchant shipping in the region was assured. When Pellew's successor Rear-Admiral William O'Bryen Drury attempted to eliminate the Dutch East Indies islands in a series of large scale invasions during 1810, the Spice Islands were captured and in 1811 Java was seized. British naval movements were completely unopposed, allowing a rapid and successful conclusion to the war in the Pacific.

References

Bibliography
 
 
 
 
 
 
 
 

Naval battles involving the Netherlands
Naval battles involving the United Kingdom
Naval battles of the Napoleonic Wars
Conflicts in 1806
Conflicts in 1807
Campaigns of the Napoleonic Wars
19th-century history of the Royal Navy